PNV may refer to:

 Basque Nationalist Party
 Venetian National Party
 Prenatal vitamins
 Potential natural vegetation